was a Japanese mathematician and curator in the Edo period. He is known for being the first to calculate the volume of a sphere using very thin slices, and to use inscribed and circumscribed polygones to approximate the circumference of a circle, and hence π. And by using a 32768-gon, he calculated its perimeter as 3.141592648... Later, in 1681, Seki Takakazu used the same method with a 131072-gon, and got  correct to 11 decimal places.

References 
 "Muramatsu Shigekiyo", Sacred Mathematics: Japanese Temple Geometry, Hidetoshi Fukagawa & Tony Rothman (2008), p. 65

17th-century Japanese mathematicians
1608 births
1695 deaths